Bright Lights, later retitled Adventures in Africa, is a 1930 American pre-Code musical comedy film photographed entirely in Technicolor and produced and released by First National Pictures, a subsidiary of Warner Bros. It premiered in Los Angeles in July 1930 but was edited and rereleased in early 1931.

The film stars Dorothy Mackaill, Frank Fay, Noah Beery and Frank McHugh. It also features the screen debut of John Carradine, who appears in a small uncredited role.

Plot
Successful actress Louanne is giving her last performance before she retires to marry a rich man instead of the man whom she really loves, Wally Dean. As she is interviewed by reporters, she tells a false story but remembers her troubled past through flashback sequences.

Louanne is shown as a dancer at a low-class café where Portuguese smuggler Miguel Parada attempts to force his affections on her. With a riot about to start, she escapes with Wally. Another flashback shows Wally as a barker at a carnival with Louanne as a dancer. Wally again saves her from an imminent riot. Back in the present, Louanne continues to lie to the reporters and tell them about her genteel background.

Fish one of the reporters, does not believe her story but says nothing. When Louanne returns to the stage to resume her performance, Miguel, who is in the audience, recognizes her and visits her dressing room because he has some "unfinished business" with her. Louanne is shocked to find him there. Wally soon appears and pretends that he has a gun in order to intimidate Miguel. He pretends to give the gun to Connie Lamont because must take the stage. While Connie is guarding Miguel, a fight erupts and Miguel reveals that he has a real gun. In the struggle for the gun, Miguel is shot and killed.

When the police arrive, Wally tries to convince them that Miguel committed suicide to save Louanne from a scandal before her marriage. Louanne's friend Peggy also provides false testimony in order to save her. The police remain unconvinced until Fish also provides false testimony that he saw Miguel pull the trigger. Louanne is cleared and realizes that she really loves Wally. She cancels her engagement to her rich fiancé and is united with Wally.

Cast

 Dorothy Mackaill as Louanne
 Frank Fay as Wally Dean
 Noah Beery as Miguel Parada
 Daphne Pollard as Mame Avery
 James Murray as Connie Lamont
 Tom Dugan as Tom Avery

 Inez Courtney as Peggy North
 Frank McHugh as Fish, a reporter
 Edmund Breese as Harris
 Edward J. Nugent as "Windy" Jones 
 Philip Strange as Fairchild

Production 
The project was first announced in the October 23, 1929 issue of Variety, with Lloyd Bacon named as director and Loretta Young, Nora Lane, William Austin and Anthony Bushell in the cast, none of whom remained with the project. In November, Michael Curtiz was announced as the director.

Principal photography was completed in early 1930. First National Pictures planned to release the film as a roadshow attraction, and it premiered on July 4, 1930 at the Warner Theatre in Los Angeles and at New York's Warner Strand Theatre in February 1931.

Writer Margaret Drennen filed a $25,000 copyright-infringement suit against the filmmakers, claiming that the film was based on her original story.

Songs

 "Nobody Cares If I'm Blue", sung by Frank Fay
 "I'm Crazy for Cannibal Love", sung by Dorothy Mackaill
 "Song of the Congo", sung by Mackaill
 "Come Along!", sung by Fay
 "All the Pretty Girls I Know", sung by Fay

 "Wall Street", sung by Fay
 "I'm Sittin' Pretty"
 "Every Little Girl He Sees", sung by Inez Courtney 
 "I'm Just a Man About Town", sung by Mackaill
 "You're an Eyeful of Heaven"

Reception 
In a contemporary review for The New York Times, critic Mordaunt Hall wrote: "[The film] is weighted down with an inept story which never rises above the dime-novel level. ... Possibly there may be some who would appreciate Frank McHugh's impersonation of an inebriated reporter—that is, for a flash—but this continues so long that it seems hardly possible that the story is supposed to be compressed into one evening backstage. It seems years."

Preservation status
Though the film was produced in Technicolor, only a black-and-white copy of the 1931 edited print (with some of the musical numbers cut) is known to have survived. A small fragment in the original Technicolor was recently discovered in the Library of Congress. In 2012, the film became available on DVD from the Warner Archive Collection in a double bill with another Dorothy Mackaill sound film, The Reckless Hour. A black-and-white copy is held by the Library of Congress.

See also
 List of early color feature films
 List of incomplete or partially lost films

References

External links
 
 
 
 

1930 films
1930 musical comedy films
1930s color films
Warner Bros. films
American films based on plays
Films directed by Michael Curtiz
First National Pictures films
Films produced by Robert North
American musical comedy films
Early color films
1930s English-language films
1930s American films